The white-eyed attila or dull-capped attila (Attila bolivianus) is a species of bird in the passerine family Tyrannidae, the tyrant flycatchers. They are found in Bolivia, Brazil, Colombia, Peru, and possibly Ecuador. Its natural habitat is subtropical or tropical swamps.

Taxonomy 
The species Attila bolivianus was first described by French ornithologist Frédéric de Lafresnaye in 1848. There are two subspecies of Attila bolivianus recognized by the International Ornithological Committee and the Clements checklist: 
A. b. nattereri Hellmayr, 1902
A. b. bolivianus Lafresnaye, 1848

Description 
It has striking pale yellow-white eyes

Distribution 
In Peru, the white-eyed attila is widespread in the eastern low-laying areas, generally south of the Amazon River.

Behavior 
The white-eyed attila generally preys on arthropods and sometimes eats fruit. It perches and scans its surroundings outward, usually from a well-lit area. When it finds its food, it rapidly flies toward it and snatches it off the surface it was on, or it may engage in hover-gleaning, first hovering then glean its prey from foliage.

Etymology 
The specific and subspecific names "bolivianus" are named for Bolivia. Its subspecific name "nattereri" is named for the Austrian naturalist Johann Natterer.

References

Attila (genus)
Birds described in 1848
Taxonomy articles created by Polbot
Taxa named by Frédéric de Lafresnaye